Zhang Guowei (born 4 January 1959 in Heqing County, Yunnan) is a male Chinese former long-distance runner who competed in the 1988 Summer Olympics, the Asian Games and the Asian Athletics Championships. He has competed in the 5000 metres, the 10,000 metres, and the Marathon. Zhang is an ethnic Bai from Yunnan province.

References

1959 births
Living people
Chinese male long-distance runners
Chinese male marathon runners
Olympic athletes of China
Athletes (track and field) at the 1988 Summer Olympics
Asian Games medalists in athletics (track and field)
Athletes (track and field) at the 1982 Asian Games
World Athletics Championships athletes for China
Athletes (track and field) at the 1990 Asian Games
Asian Games gold medalists for China
Asian Games bronze medalists for China
Medalists at the 1982 Asian Games
Medalists at the 1990 Asian Games
People from Dali
Runners from Yunnan